MFK Vítkovice is a football club from Vítkovice, Ostrava, Czech Republic. It was founded in 1919 as FC Vítkovice, announced bankruptcy in 2011 and transformed to MFK Vítkovice. The club won the Czechoslovak First League in the 1985–86 season.

The club has always been somewhat overshadowed by the town's main team FC Baník Ostrava. The teams have a mutual rivalry, as Baník is based in the Silesian part of the city, while Vítkovice are located in the Moravian part of Ostrava. MFK Vítkovice however still maintain a small local fan base.

They also hold a rivalry with regional side FK Fotbal Třinec from Třinec.

History
The club was founded in 1919 as SK Slavoj Vítkovice and played their matches in the Kunčičky district of Ostrava. The club however vanished due to financial problems and was succeeded in 1922 by SK Vítkovice. The club then became one of the strongest teams in the Ostrava region. In 1937–1938 a new stadium was constructed in the district of Vítkovice. It was supposed to be opened to the public in October 1938 but it was unable to proceed due to the German occupation of the city. Instead, the stadium was opened a few years later.

The club played in the highest division from 1950 to 1952.  In 1952 the league underwent reorganization and Vítkovice were forcibly relegated to a lower division. However the club won promotion to the top flight again in 1981. Then in the 1985–1986 season the club achieved their greatest success, as Vítkovice led by manager Ivan Kopecký won the Czechoslovak First League. Vítkovice subsequently played in the European cup for the first time in their history. The club was strongly financially supported by local iron and steel works which unfortunately fell into a financial crisis after the Velvet Revolution of 1989. The industry withdrew some of its support and the club was forced to merge with FC Karviná in 1994. Afterwards the club was relegated to the Second Division. The merger was overturned a year later, which meant the club was relegated to the Third Division in 1995, and although the club returned to the Second Division in 1996, Vítkovice struggled in the middle of the table. After persistent financial problems, the club dropped back to the Third Division (MSFL) in 2010.

On 9 February 2011, the club announced its withdrawal from the second half of the MSFL season due to insolvency. The club's results from the first half of the season were annulled, with the club's debts reported to be more than 15 million Czech koruna. They finished 2nd in the Regional Championship in the 2013–14 season and were promoted to Moravian Division E. They finished 2nd in Division E and won promotion to the MSFL in 2014–15.

In the season 2019/20, the club finished last 16th in the league table and relegated due to financial problems.

Stadium
Městský stadion is a multi-purpose stadium in Ostrava-Vítkovice, Czech Republic. Used primarily for football, it is the home stadium of FC Vítkovice, and from the year 2015, even FC Baník Ostrava. In 2014-2015 it has been reconstructed. It also hosts the annual Golden Spike Ostrava athletic event. The stadium holds 15,275 spectators, for football matches 15,163. It hosted the 2018 IAAF Continental Cup.

Historical names
 1919 — SK Slavoj Vítkovice
 1922 — SK Vítkovice
 1923 — SSK Vítkovice
 1937 — SK Železárny Vítkovice
 1939 — ČSK Vítkovice
 1945 — SK Vítkovice Železárny
 1948 – Sokol Vítkovice Železárny
 1953 — Baník Vítkovice
 1957 — TJ VŽKG Ostrava
 1979 — TJ Vítkovice
 1993 — FC Vítkovice Kovkor
 1994 — merger with Kovona Karviná => FC Karviná-Vítkovice
 1995 — split => FC Vítkovice
 2012 — MFK Vítkovice

Honours and achievements
Czechoslovak First League (first tier)
 Champions: 1985–86
Moravian–Silesian Football League (third tier)
 Champions: 1995–96
UEFA Cup
 Quarter-finals: 1987–88

References

External links
 

Football clubs in the Czech Republic
Association football clubs established in 1919
Czechoslovak First League clubs
Czech First League clubs
MFK Vítkovice
Football clubs in Czechoslovakia